Patrick Cadell (born 1999) is an Irish hurler who plays for Tipperary Senior Championship club J.K. Bracken's and at inter-county level with the Tipperary senior hurling team. He usually lines out at midfield.

Career
Cadell made his senior debut for Tipperary on 25 January 2020 in the opening round of the 2020 National Hurling League against Limerick in a 0-18 to 2-14 defeat.

He made his championship debut on 1 November 2020, coming on as a substitute in the second half of the 2-17 to 3-23 Munster semi-final defeat to Limerick.

Honours

Our Lady's Secondary School
Dr. Croke Cup (1): 2017
Dr. Harty Cup (1): 2017

University College Cork
Fitzgibbon Cup (1): 2020

J.K. Bracken's
Séamus Ó Riain Cup (1): 2019

Tipperary
All-Ireland Senior Hurling Championship (1): 2019
All-Ireland Under-21 Hurling Championship (1): 2018
All-Ireland Under-20 Hurling Championship (1): 2019
Munster Under-20 Hurling Championship (1): 2019
All-Ireland Minor Hurling Championship (1): 2016
Munster Minor Hurling Championship (1):2016

References

External link

 Paddy Cadell profile at the Tipperary GAA website

1999 births
Living people
UCC hurlers
J.K. Bracken's hurlers
Tipperary inter-county hurlers